Gaelic Storm is a Celtic band founded in Santa Monica, California in 1996. Their musical output includes pieces from traditional Irish music, Scottish music, and original tunes in both the Celtic and Celtic rock genres. The band had its first big break in 1997, appearing in the film Titanic and recording songs on the movie's soundtrack album. Their most recent album, Go Climb A Tree, was released on July 28, 2017.

History 
Gaelic Storm's origins can be traced back to 1996, when Patrick Murphy and Steve Wehmeyer joined with Steve Twigger, drummer Shep Lonsdale, fiddler Samantha Hunt, and Uillean piper Brian Walsh to perform at O'Brien's Irish Pub and Restaurant in Santa Monica, California, of which Murphy was the manager. This led to a number of pub performances for the next year.

In 1997, Gaelic Storm appeared in the film Titanic as the steerage band, performing "Blarney Pilgrim" (Jig), "John Ryan's Polka", "Kesh Jig" and "Drowsy Maggie" (Reel). The first two were published on the second soundtrack album as "An Irish Party in Third Class", while the band's second album, Herding Cats, featured "Blarney Pilgrim" and "Drowsy Maggie" as "Titanic Set (Medley)". 

After this film appearance, Gaelic Storm started touring, and have performed in the United States, Canada, the United Kingdom, France and Japan. Brian Walsh left the band before the first album was recorded in 1998. Samantha Hunt left sometime in 2000 after the group's second album.

The group has released 13 albums since its inception, including the compilation album Special Reserve. The band is known for their energetic renditions of traditional Irish music and Scottish traditional music, and for their albums which consistently top the Billboard world music charts.

From 2002-2006, the band's membership underwent a transition period. The second fiddler, Kathleen Keane, left the band after their third album, "Tree," and drummer Shep Lonsdale left leaving only Murphy, Wehmeyer, and Twigger as the original members. Their soundman at the time, Tom Brown, was also a bagpiper and whistle player and began playing at periods in their show. Ryan Lacey was recruited on drums. This quintet recorded three new tracks for their fourth album, Special Reserve, also a compilation album of their previous three albums. Deborah Clark Colon was the fiddler on the three new tracks, "Courting in the Kitchen," "Schooner Lake Set," and "Nancy Whiskey." Chinese-born Shasha Zhang toured with them on fiddle for several months in 2002. For a brief time in approximately 2003, the band recruited their, to date, only male fiddler, Bob Banerjee. Teresa Gowan was also the group's fiddler during this transitional period. Finally by 2004, Ellery Klein was hired as full time fiddler.

Gaelic Storm's fifth album, How Are We Getting Home?, was released in August 2004 and debuted at #3 on the Billboard World Music Charts, #10 on the Billboard Heatseekers Chart, and re-entered the September 2005 World Albums Chart at #3. 

By 2005 Tom Brown had left the band and Peter Purvis was brought in to play bagpipes, uillean pipes, deger pipes, and whistle.

In January 2006, the band released their first DVD, Gaelic Storm: Live In Chicago, filmed live at the House of Blues in Chicago. In early 2006, founding member Steve Wehmeyer retired full time from the band and became a college professor. As of 2022, he still co-writes the music with Murphy and Twigger, and makes occasional appearances with the band. He is the only member that has not been replaced.

After Wehmeyer's full time departure, the band's membership stabilized and remains largely unchanged with the exception of the fiddler which has since changed hands numerous times.

The band's sixth album, Bring Yer Wellies, was released on July 25, 2006 and debuted at #2 on the Billboard World Chart, #16 on the Internet Sales Chart, and #31 on the Independent Album Chart.   Gaelic Storm's next album, What's the Rumpus? was released on July 8, 2008 on the band's own label, Lost Again Records.  It reached #1 on the Billboard World Chart.

A Simlish version of the song "Scalliwag", from the album Bring Yer Wellies, was recorded and featured on the World music channel in the expansion pack, The Sims 2: Bon Voyage, for the PC Game, The Sims 2.

, original members Murphy and Twigger are still in the band, joined by Ryan Lacey (since 2003), Pete Purvis (since 2005) of Merrickville, Ontario, and Natalya Kay (since 2022).

Band members 

Current members:
 Patrick Murphy (Accordion, Spoons, Bodhrán, Harmonica, Lead Vocals)
 Steve Twigger (Guitar, Bouzouki, Mandolin, Lead Vocals)
 Ryan Lacey (Djembe, Doumbek, Surdo, Cajón, Ukulele, Vocals, Various Percussion)
 Peter Purvis (Highland Bagpipes, Uillean pipes, DegerPipes, Whistle)
 Natalya Kay (Fiddle, Vocals)

Former members:
 Katie Grennan (Fiddle, Vocals)
 Kiana Weber (Fiddle, Vocals, Mandolin)
 Jessie Burns (Fiddle, Vocals)
 Brian Walsh (Uillean pipes)
 Samantha Hunt (Fiddle)
 Kathleen Keane (Fiddle, Whistle, Vocals)
 Ellery Klein (Fiddle, Vocals)
 Shep Lonsdale (Djembe, Doumbek, Surdo, and Various Other Percussion)
 Steve Wehmeyer (Bodhrán, Didgeridoo, Vocals)
 Tom Brown (Bagpipes, Tin Whistle, DegerPipes)
 Bob Banerjee (Fiddle)
 Teresa Gowan (Fiddle)

Guest musicians by album

 Herding Cats
 John Whelan (Button Accordion)
 Eric Rigler (Uilleann pipes, Low "D" Whistle)
 Marie Reilly (Fiddle)
 Tree
 Mike Porcaro (Bass)
 Special Reserve
 Deborah Clark Colón (Fiddle on Tracks 1, 3, & 8)
 How Are We Getting Home?
 Dave Pomeroy (Bass guitars)
 Nanci Griffith (special guest vocals on Track 5)

 Bring Yer Wellies
 Jeff May (Bass guitar)
 Rob Forkner (Bodhran)
 Michael Ramos (Accordion)
 Lauren Dilbert (Didgeridoo)
 What's the Rumpus?
 "Crazy" Arthur Brown (Vocals)
 Jeff May (Bass guitar)
 Lloyd Maines (pedal steel, Mandolin, Banjo)
 David Boyle (Keyboards, Accordion)
 Cabbage
 Jeff May (Bass guitar)
 Kevin Smith (Bass guitar)
 David Boyle (Keyboards)
 Michael Ramos (Accordion)

Discography 

 Gaelic Storm (July 28, 1998)
 Herding Cats (September 20, 1999)
 Tree (June 19, 2001)
 Special Reserve (August 19, 2003) (compilation)
 How Are We Getting Home? (August 3, 2004)
 Bring Yer Wellies (July 25, 2006)
 What's The Rumpus? (July 8, 2008)
 Cabbage (August 3, 2010)
 Chicken Boxer (July 31, 2012)
 The Boathouse (August 20, 2013)
 Full Irish: The Best of Gaelic Storm 2004–2014 (July 29, 2014) (compilation)
 Matching Sweaters (July 24, 2015)
 Go Climb a Tree (July 28, 2017)

Filmography 
 Titanic (1997)
 Gaelic Storm Live in Chicago (2006)

Interviews 
 Rambles.NET interview with Patrick Murphy
 Rambles.NET interview with Steve Twigger
 Tap Milwaukee interview w/ Steve Twigger & Patrick Murphy

References

Notes

External links 
 Irish Echo ONLINE Gaelic Storm Interview
 Gaelic Storm Homepage

Celtic fusion groups
Musical groups from California
Sony Classical Records artists
Celtic rock music